The town of Fuersteneck, near Grafenau in Bavaria, Germany, was the location of a witch trial in 1703. A record of the trial was obtained from the parsonage of Röhrnbach.

Accusation 

Afra Dickh (also written Afra Dick) was a serving girl at the Frueth farm in Wittersitt, part of the modern-day parish of Ringelai. The accusation made was of poisoning, bedevilment of humans and animals, associating with other witches and dealings with the devil. Co-accused were the 13-year-old shepherdess Maria, who was also in service at the same farm and the widowed farmer Maria Kölbl, a mother of 15 from Neidberg near Ringelai.

Judgement 

On account of magic and arson (in puncto veneficii et incendii), Afra Dickh was hanged by executioner Sebastian Fleischmann of Passau on 1 June 1703, at the place of execution in Fürsteneck near Perlesreut, and afterward burnt to ashes at the stake with 30 blocks of wood and 40 pounds of pitch.

References

1703 in law
18th century in Bavaria
1703 in the Holy Roman Empire
1703 in Europe
Trials in Germany
Witch trials in Germany